Kacper Filip Szelążek (born 28 April 1984 in Ełk, Poland) – Polish singer, countertenor.

Life and career

He graduated in vocal studies in 2016 at the Fryderyk Chopin University of Music in Warsaw in the singing class of dr. hab. Artur Stefanowicz (previously he obtained the title of engineer at the Faculty of Electronics and Information Technology of the Warsaw University of Technology). He made his debut in 2013 in the Nerone part in the L'incoronazione di Poppea by Monterverdi, which he performed with great success at the Collegium Nobilium in Warsaw  and in 2015 in the Salle Frank Martin Auditorium in Geneva. In 2013, as the best young musician of the year, he received a recording offer from Polish Radio (which was realised in the following form: Karol Szymanowski – Three passages to words by Kasprowicz, Witold Lutosławski – 5 songs to words by Kazimiera Iłłakowiczówna and arias of Sesto from Handel's Giulio Cesare) and to represent Poland at the Young Talents Competition EBU in Bratislava (International Forum of Young Performers New Talent). He performed, among others at: the National Philharmonic in Warsaw, Teatro Ristori in Verona, Teatro Thalia in Lisbon, the Concert Hall of the Pushkin Museum in Moscow, the Grand Theater–National Opera in Warsaw, the Lutosławski Concert Studio in Warsaw, the Warsaw Chamber Opera, the Dutch National Opera in Amsterdam. In his repertoire he also has oratorio parts, among others passions by J. S. Bach, cantatas by Handel, Porpora, Vivaldi and a large song repertoire, i.a. he is the only countertenor in the world that performs 3 poems to words by Kasprowicz by Karol Szymanowski.

Awards and Distinction
 2016 – he received the Carlo Maria Giulini award at the Stanisław Moniuszko International Vocal Competition in Warsaw.
 2017 – he was awarded the Fryderyk Chopin University of Music Medal Magna cum laude.

Repertoire 
 2013 L'incoronazione di Poppea by Monteverdi, as Nerone – the production of the Opera Institute in Warsaw
 2015 Rodelinda by Handel, as Bertarido – the production of the Opera Institute in Warsaw
 2017 Farnace by Vivaldi, as Gilade, as the first countertenor in the role – the production of Dramma per Musica Association of the III Baroque Operas Festival in Warsaw 
 2018  La morte d'Orfeo by Landi, as Bacco role – the production Dutch National Opera in Amsterdam  opera conducted by Christophe Rousset and the Les Talens Lyriques orchestra.
 2018 Giulio Cesare by Handel, title role, conducted by Paul Esswood – the production of the Grand Theatre, Poznań – Concert performance
 2019 La finta pazza by Sacrati, as Eunuco, conducted by Leonardo García Alarcón and the Cappella Mediterranea – production of the Opéra de Dijon
 2019 Orlando generoso by Steffani, as Medoro, Musical Directors Paul O'Dette & Stephen Stubbs and BEMF Orchestra – the production of the Boston Early Music Festival in Emerson Cutler Majestic Theatre Boston, MA
 2019 Giulio Cesare by Handel]], as Tolomeo, conducted by Christophe Rousset and the Les Talens Lyriques orchestra – concert performance in Theatre des Champs Elyses Paris France, Festival George Enescu 2019 Bucharest Romania in Romanian Athenaeum, Festival D'Ambronay 2019 France
 2019 Agrippina by Handel, as Narciso, conducted by Christophe Rousset and the Les Talens Lyriques orchestra – concert performance in Romanian Athenaeum, Festival George Enescu 2019 Bucharest Romania,
 2019 singing in the programme Himmelsmusik, conducted by Christina Pluhar and L’ARPEGGIATA orchestra in Pomeranian Philharmonic Bydgoszcz, Poland and Heinrich Schütz Musikfest in Dresden, Germany
 2019 Carmina Burana by Orff, conducted by Lorenzo Passerini in Grand Theatre, Warsaw, Poland
 2020 Carmina Burana by Orff, conducted by Dimitris Botinis in Filharmonia Łódzka im. Artura Rubinsteina in Łódź, Poland
 2020 singing with Radziejewska in the program Farinelli contra Carestini, Festiwal Dramma per Musica ONLINE 2020 ,conducted by :pl:Lilianna Stawarz and the Royal Baroque Ensemble, Warsaw, Poland
 2020 Il palazzo incantato by Rossi in Prasildo/Le Nain, role, conducted by Leonardo García Alarcón and the Cappella Mediterranea – new production of the Opéra de Dijon, France
 2021 Pergolesi's Stabat Mater with Hanna Sosnowska - conducted by Paweł Przytocki in Filharmonia Łódzka im. Artura Rubinsteina in Łódź, Poland
 2021 Messiah by Handel, conducted by Kai Bumann in  Pomeranian Philharmonic im. I. J. Paderewskiego, Bydgoszcz, Poland
 2021 Agrippina by Handel, as Narciso, with Ann Hallenberg  conducted by Francesco Corti and The Drottningholm Theatre Orchestra – Drottningholm Palace Theatre, Stockholm, Sweden
 2021 Il palazzo incantato by Rossi, as Prasildo/Le Nain, conducted by Leonardo García Alarcón and the Cappella Mediterranea – Opéra national de Lorraine, Nancy, France

References

1984 births
Living people
21st-century Polish male opera singers
Countertenors